U Thaung is a Burmese politician who served as Minister for Science and Technology of Myanmar from 1 November 1998 to 30 March 2011. He previously served as an MP in the House of Representatives for Kyaukse Township constituency. He contested the Kyaukse Township in the 2010 Burmese general election and won a seat. However, doubts were raised on the validity of ballot counting and transparency during polling, issues that National Democratic Force candidate Khin Maung Than, reiterated to the Union Election Commission.

References

Members of Pyithu Hluttaw
Government ministers of Myanmar
People from Mandalay Region
1937 births
Living people
Specially Designated Nationals and Blocked Persons List
Individuals related to Myanmar sanctions